In geometry, the parabidiminished rhombicosidodecahedron is one of the Johnson solids. It is also a canonical polyhedron.

It can be constructed as a rhombicosidodecahedron with two opposing pentagonal cupolae removed. Related Johnson solids are the diminished rhombicosidodecahedron  where one cupola is removed, the metabidiminished rhombicosidodecahedron where two non-opposing cupolae are removed, and the tridiminished rhombicosidodecahedron where three cupolae are removed.

Example

External links
 

Johnson solids